Richard "Rich" Wolfson (Born 1950) is the Benjamin F. Wissler professor of Physics at Middlebury College since 1976.

He is the author of numerous articles and books.

Wolfson has taught several courses at the Teaching Company.

Bibliography
Professor Wolfson is the author of several books, including the college textbooks Physics for Scientists and Engineers, Essential University Physics, and Energy, Environment, and Climate. He is also an interpreter of science for the nonspecialist, a contributor to Scientific American, and author of the books Nuclear Choices: A Citizen's Guide to Nuclear Technology and Simply Einstein: Relativity Demystified.

(1999). Physics for Scientists and Engineers, Addison-Wesley,  
(2003). Simply Einstein: Relativity Demystified, W.W. Norton & Co.

References

External links
Homepage at Middlebury College website

Middlebury College faculty
Living people
American textbook writers
American male non-fiction writers
Year of birth missing (living people)
Fellows of the American Physical Society